Deroplia is a genus of beetles belonging to the family Cerambycidae.

The species of this genus are found in Europe and Africa.

Species

Species:

Deroplia affinis 
Deroplia albida 
Deroplia alutacea

References

Cerambycidae
Cerambycidae genera